Chalcides boulengeri, also known commonly as Boulenger's feylinia and Boulenger's wedge-snouted skink, is a species of lizard in the family Scincidae. The species is native to the Maghreb region of North Africa.

Etymology
The specific name, boulengeri, is in honor of Belgian-born British herpetologist George Albert Boulenger.

Geographic range
C. boulengeri is found in Algeria, Libya, Morocco, Tunisia, and Western Sahara.

Habitat
The preferred natural habitats of C. boulengeri are desert and shrubland.

Reproduction
C. boulengeri is viviparous. Litter size is two neonates.

References

Further reading
Anderson J (1892). "On a small Collection of Mammals, Reptiles, and Batrachians from Barbary". Proceedings of the Zoological Society of London 1892: 3–24 + Plate I. (Chalcides boulengeri, new species, pp. 17–18 + Plate I, figures 1–3).
Sindaco R, Jeremčenko VK (2008). The Reptiles of the Western Palearctic. 1. Annotated Checklist and Distributional Atlas of the Turtles, Crocodiles, Amphisbaenians and Lizards of Europe, North Africa, Middle East and Central Asia. (Monographs of the Societas Herpetologica Italica). Latina, Italy: Edizioni Belvedere. 580 pp. .
Trape J-F, Trape S, Chirio L (2012). Lézards, crocodiles et tortues d'Afrique occidentale et du Sahara. Paris: IRD Orstom. 503 pp. . (in French).

Chalcides
Skinks of Africa
Reptiles described in 1892
Taxa named by John Anderson (zoologist)